William Gibson Bogart  (June 17, 1903 – July 20, 1977) was an American pulp fiction writer.  He is best known for writing several Doc Savage novels, under the pseudonym Kenneth Robeson.

In addition to the Doc Savage novels, Bogart published works in many genres under his own name.  He also created the detective Johnny Saxon, and featured him in several novels.

Doc Savage novels
 World's Fair Goblin (co-written with Lester Dent)
 Hex
 The Angry Ghost (co-written with Lester Dent)
 The Spotted Men
 The Flying Goblin
 Tunnel Terror
 The Awful Dynasty (co-written with Lester Dent)
 Bequest of Evil (co-written with Dent)
 The Magic Forest
 Fire and Ice (co-written with Dent)
 Death in Little Houses
 The Disappearing Lady
 Target for Death
 The Death Lady (Doc Savage)

External links
 Biographical info at The Hidalgo Trading Co.
 Bibliography

20th-century American novelists
20th-century American male writers
1903 births
1977 deaths
Pulp fiction writers
American male novelists